The Soviet Union's 1983 nuclear test series was a group of 27 nuclear tests conducted in 1983. These tests  followed the 1982 Soviet nuclear tests series and preceded the 1984 Soviet nuclear tests series.

References

1983
1983 in the Soviet Union
1983 in military history
Explosions in 1983